Katherine Marie "Katie" Weatherston (born April 6, 1983) is a Canadian retired ice hockey player and head coach of the Lebanese women’s national ice hockey team. As a member of the Canadian women's national ice hockey team, she won Olympic gold in the women's ice hockey tournament at the 2006 Winter Olympics in Turin and medalled at two IIHF Women's World Championships.

Playing career
Weatherston played four years of college ice hockey with the Dartmouth Big Green women's ice hockey program in the ECAC Hockey conference of the NCAA Division I, from 2002 to 2005 and for the 2006–07 season. 

She debuted with the Canadian national team at the 2004 Four Nations Cup. For the 2005–06 school year, Weatherston opted to put her college career on hold in order to focus entirely on preparing to represent Canada at the 2006 Winter Olympics.

After completing her college eligibility with Dartmouth, Weatherston played the 2007–08 season in the Canadian Women's Hockey League (CWHL). She began the season with the Ottawa Capital Canucks but transferred to and finished the season with the Montréal Stars.

In 2009, Weatherston sustained a concussion during a pick up hockey game. It was not her first concussion but, unlike previous instances, her post-concussion symptoms lingered for over two years – dashing her hopes of participating in the 2010 Winter Olympics and bringing an early end to her playing career.

Personal life
Weatherston was born on April 6, 1983 in Thunder Bay, Ontario to David and Anna Weatherston. She has a bachelor’s degree in psychology from Dartmouth College.

Career statistics

Regular season and playoffs 

Source: USCHO, Elite Prospects

International

Source:

Awards and honours
 2003 ECAC All-Rookie Team
 2003 All-Ivy Rookie Team
 2003 ECAC All-Star Honourable Mention
 2004–05 New England Writers Association Team
 2004–05 All-Ivy Second Team
 2004–05 All-USCHO Third Team
 2006-07 ECAC Coaches Preseason All-League Selection
 2006-07 ECAC Media Preseason All-League Selection
 2007 ECAC Tournament Most Valuable Player
 2008 Canadian Women's Hockey League Eastern Division All-Star
 2008 Canadian Women's Hockey League All-Rookie Team

References

External links
 

1983 births
Living people
Sportspeople from Thunder Bay
Ice hockey people from Ontario
Canadian women's ice hockey forwards
Les Canadiennes de Montreal players
Canadian Women's Hockey League players
Dartmouth Big Green women's ice hockey players
Canadian expatriate ice hockey players in the United States
Ice hockey players at the 2006 Winter Olympics
Medalists at the 2006 Winter Olympics
Olympic gold medalists for Canada
Olympic ice hockey players of Canada
Olympic medalists in ice hockey